Milton Selzer (October 25, 1918 – October 21, 2006) was an American stage, film, and television actor.

Early life
Born in Lowell, Massachusetts, Selzer and his family moved to Portsmouth, New Hampshire where he was raised. After graduating from Portsmouth High School, he attended the University of New Hampshire before serving in World War II. After the war, Selzer moved to New York to train at the American Academy of Dramatic Arts and The New School.

Career
Selzer's acting career began with small parts on Broadway. After moving to Hollywood in 1960, he began a prolific career as a character actor making many guest appearances in film and television.

Stage
Selzer's Broadway credits include Tiger at the Gates (1955), Once Upon a Tailor (1954), Arms and the Man (1950), and Julius Caesar (1950).

Television
Selzer's many television roles included appearances on The Twilight Zone, where he portrayed an alien in "Hocus-Pocus and Frisby", and as the miserly son-in-law in "The Masks". He appeared as Dr. Nobel in an episode of Have Gun Will Travel, He appeared in an episode of The Asphalt Jungle in 1961. In 1962 he portrayed an angel - Anthology/The Twilight Zone. He made two memorable guest appearances on Perry Mason; in 1963 he played defendant and title character Dr. Aaron Stuart in "The Case of the Decadent Dean," and in 1964 he played murder victim Dr. Max Taylor in "The Case of the Bullied Bowler".

From 1965–67, he made seven guest appearances as Professor Parker in Get Smart followed by roles on That Girl, The Rat Patrol, Hogan's Heroes, and The Bold Ones: The Protectors. In the many crime shows of the 1960s and 1970s, Selzer would often portray unsympathetic characters who would also possess sad and often pathetic qualities. He was a regular on the 1973 situation comedy Needles and Pins as Julius Singer.

He made his last onscreen appearance in the 1995 television film Cagney & Lacey: Together Again.

Film
Selzer's film career includes roles in The Young Savages (1961) opposite Burt Lancaster, In Enemy Country (1968), The Buddy System (1984) and Sid and Nancy (1986).

Death
On October 21, 2006, four days before his 88th birthday, Selzer died of pulmonary complications.

Filmography

Film

Television

References

External links
 
 
 

1918 births
2006 deaths
Actors from Lowell, Massachusetts
American male film actors
American male stage actors
American male television actors
Male actors from New Hampshire
People from Portsmouth, New Hampshire
Military personnel from New Hampshire
American military personnel of World War II
University of New Hampshire alumni
American Academy of Dramatic Arts alumni
The New School alumni
Jewish American male actors
20th-century American male actors
20th-century American Jews
21st-century American Jews